Mother Knows Best may refer to:

Film and television
 Mother Knows Best (film) Fox's first "talkie" (1928)
 "Mother Knows Best" (Class of the Titans) an episode from season one of Canadian animated television series Class of the Titans
 Mother Knows Best (1997 TV movie) by Larry Shaw (director) starring Joanna Kerns, Christine Elise and Grant Show.

Literature
Mother Knows Best, a novel by Serena Valentino

Music
 "Mother Knows Best" (song), performed by Donna Murphy, on the soundtrack of the Disney film Tangled
 "Mother Knows Best", song by Richard Thompson from the album Rumor and Sigh 1991
 "Mother Knows Best", song by Crystal Castles from the album Doe Deer 2007

See also 

 Father Knows Best (disambiguation)